The Saavedra position is one of the best-known chess endgame studies. It is named after the Spanish priest Fernando Saavedra  (1849–1922), who lived in Glasgow during the late 19th century. Though not a strong player, he spotted a win involving a dramatic underpromotion in a position previously thought to have been a draw.

This is among a minority of positions where king and pawn can win against a king and rook, and one of the most famous examples of underpromotion in chess. It is also a rare example of a player being famous for a single move.

Solution
The position as it is usually given today, with White to move and win, is shown in the diagram. The solution is:
1. c7 Rd6+ 2. Kb5 
(If 2.Kc5 then Rd1 threatening a skewer via 3...Rc1; if instead 
2.Kb7? then Rd7 pins the pawn, allowing black to capture it to assure a draw.)
2... Rd5+ 
Or 2...Rd2 3.c8=Q Rb2+ 4.Ka4 Ra2+ 5.Kb3 Rb2+ 6.Kc3 and White wins.
3. Kb4 Rd4+ 4. Kb3 Rd3+ 5. Kc2 Rd4! 6. c8=R! 
Threatening 7.Ra8+; instead 6.c8=Q? Rc4+! 7.Qxc4 is stalemate.
6... Ra4 7. Kb3
Black must either lose the rook (allowing White an elementary checkmate) or be checkmated by 8.Rc1.

History

The long history of the study has its origins in a game played between Richard Fenton and William Potter in 1875. From the position shown, the game continued 1.Rxh3 Kxh3 2.Kc6 Rxa5 3.b7 Ra6+ and the players agreed a draw. However, as Johannes Zukertort pointed out in the City of London Chess Magazine, 1875, White could have won with 4.Kc5 (not 4.Kb5 Ra1 when White cannot promote the pawn because of 5...Rb1+) 4...Ra5+ 5.Kc4 Ra4+ 6.Kc3 (or 6.Kb3 Ra1 7.Kb2) 6...Ra3+ 7. Kb2, and White will promote the pawn when the queen versus rook endgame is a theoretical win (this winning method had earlier been demonstrated in a study by Josef Kling and Bernhard Horwitz published in The Chess Player, September 1853).

Upon Potter's death in March 1895, G.E. Barbier published a position in his Glasgow Weekly Citizen chess column of April 27, 1895, which he claimed to have occurred in Fenton–Potter. In fact, he had misremembered the game, and the position he published (see diagram) had never arisen. It was published as a study with Black to play and White to win; the technique is just that demonstrated by Zukertort and by Kling and Horwitz before him: 1... Rd6+ 2. Kb5 Rd5+ 3. Kb4 Rd4+ 4. Kb3 Rd3+ 5. Kc2.

When Barbier published this solution on May 4, he claimed that by moving the black king from h6 to a1 the position could be transformed into a "Black to move and draw" study. On May 11 he gave the solution 1... Rd6+ 2. Kb5 Rd5+ 3. Kb4 Rd4+ 4. Kb3 Rd3+ 5. Kc2 Rd4! 6. c8=Q Rc4+ 7. Qxc4 stalemate; however, as Saavedra pointed out, 6. c8=R instead wins, a solution published by Barbier on May 18. Saavedra, a Spanish priest who lived in Glasgow at the time, was a weak amateur player; his sole claim to fame in the chess world is his discovery of this move. The modern form of the position was obtained by Emanuel Lasker (in The Brooklyn Daily Eagle, June 1, 1902, p. 53) by moving the c7-pawn back to c6 and changing the stipulation to the standard "White to play and win".

Alternate line
As computer-generated endgame tablebases confirm, Black can offer longer resistance by 3...Kb2, for which White has only one winning reply, 4.c8=Q, promoting to a queen instead of the underpromotion to a rook. Then White can force checkmate on the twenty-sixth move. However, per the anthropocentric conventions of endgame studies, moves that result in positions known to be theoretically lost are considered sidelines.

Legacy

The study has been widely reproduced, and in Test Tube Chess, John Roycroft calls it "unquestionably the most famous of all endgame studies". It has inspired many other composers: the many promotions in the studies of Harold Lommer, for example, were inspired by the Saavedra position. Mark Liburkin was also one such composer. Plaskett's Puzzle is yet another famous endgame problem that features underpromotion prominently.

A number of composers have produced work which elaborates on the basic Saavedra idea. The study shown to the left is the most famous of these; it is by Mark Liburkin (second prize, Shakhmaty v SSSR, 1931) and is White to play and win. After the first move 1.Nc1, Black has two main defences; the first of these shows the Saavedra theme: 1.Nc1 Rxb5 (1...Kb2 2.Nd3+ wins) 2.c7 Rd5+ 3.Nd3! Rxd3+ 4.Kc2 Rd4 and we have a position already seen in the Saavedra position itself; White wins with 5.c8=R Ra4 6.Kb3.

The other Black defence features two new stalemate defences, and a second underpromotion, this time to bishop; this is why this study is well-known while many other elaborations on the Saavedra position are forgotten: 1.Nc1 Rd5+ 2.Kc2 (2.Nd3? Rxd3+ 3.Kc2 Rd5! 4.Kc3 Rxb5 draws; 2.Ke2? Rxb5 3.c7 Re5+ draws) 2...Rc5+ 3.Kd3! (3.Kd2? Rxb5 4.c7 [4.Nb3+ Rxb3 5.c7 Rb2+! – see below] Rb2+! 5.Kd1 Rc2! 6.Kxc2 stalemate) 3...Rxb5 (3...Rxc1 4.Kd4, intending 5.Kd5 and 6.b6, wins) 4.c7 Rb8! and now both 5.cxb8=Q and 5.cxb8=R are stalemate, 5.cxb8=N leaves a drawn ending, and 5.Nb3+ Rxb3+ 6.Kc2 Rb2+! 7.Kc1 (7.Kc3 Kb1! and Black wins) only draws after 7...Rb1+ or 7...Rb4 8.c8=Q (8.c8=R Ra4 is safe now) Rc4+. White can only win by 5.cxb8=B! followed by a bishop and knight checkmate.

References

Further reading
John Roycroft, Test Tube Chess (Faber and Faber, 1972) – positions 112 to 115 tell the story of the position

External links
Tim Krabbé's page on the position, including the original five Weekly Citizen columns
Video explaining the Saavedra Position

Chess endgames